BlueSky Open Platform is an open-source software e-learning project designed to balance education resources between well-developed Chinese cities and poor regions of China. It was a collaboration between Xi'an Jiaotong University and IBM. In 2006 BlueSky won the China National Science and Technology Progress Award.

References

External links 
 
BlueSky Incubator wiki

Science and technology in the People's Republic of China